Morling College is a Baptist college in Macquarie Park, New South Wales. It is affiliated with the Australian Baptist Ministries. It is an approved teaching institution of the Australian College of Theology and a registered teaching institution of the University of Divinity, and is a member of the South Pacific Association of Bible Colleges. The principal is the Revd Ross Clifford AM.

History
The college was established in 1916 as Baptist Theological College of New South Wales. It moved to its present location in 1961. It was given its current name in 1985, in honour of the Revd George Henry Morling, who served as principal from 1921 to 1960.In 2021, Vose Seminary became a campus of the Morling College.

Notable people and alumni
 Michael Frost, author and missiologist
 Ross Clifford political commentator, author and principal
 Graham Joseph Hill theologian
 Mark Tronson pastor

References

Baptist universities and colleges
Education in Sydney
Seminaries and theological colleges in New South Wales
Educational institutions established in 1916
1916 establishments in Australia
Australian College of Theology
University of Divinity
Baptist Christianity in Australia